Haji Javed Iqbal Abbasi is a Pakistani politician and former senator. He had been member of the National Assembly of Pakistan from 1985 to 1988 and again from 1990 to 1993.

Political career
He was elected to the National Assembly of Pakistan as an independent candidate from NA-12 (Abbottabad) in 1985 Pakistani general election.

He was re-elected the National Assembly of Pakistan as a candidate of Islami Jamhoori Ittehad from NA-12 (Abbottabad) in 1990 Pakistani general election. He received 43,764 votes and defeated independent candidate Sardar Gul Khatab.

He became senator on the ticket of Pakistan Muslim League (Nawaz) (PML-N) in 1997 senate election.

After 1999 Pakistani coup d'état he was arrested and jailed in August 2000 and was convicted in the assets beyond means case in which National Accountability Bureau gave him five years rigorous imprisonment with a fine of Rs21.25 million. He was also disqualified for 10 years for holding any public office.

References

Living people
Year of birth missing (living people)
Pakistani prisoners and detainees
Pakistani MNAs 1985–1988
Pakistani MNAs 1990–1993
Members of the Senate of Pakistan
Pakistan Muslim League (N) MNAs
Pakistani politicians convicted of crimes